Charles Cummings (c. 1870, Indiana – October 4, 1918, Los Angeles, California) was an early American actor.

He starred in 16 films between 1913 and 1917 in films such as Rose of San Juan and American Born with actors such as Harry von Meter and Louise Lester.

Filmography
American Born (1913)
Rose of San Juan (1913)
The Substitute Jewel (1915)
The Disappearing Necklace (1915)
Mysteries of the Grand Hotel (1915)
The Strangler's Cord (1915)
The Mother Call (1916)
Circumstantial Guilt (1916)
When He Came Back (1916)
Behind Life's Stage (1916)
The Chalice of Sorrow (1916), aka The Fatal Promise (UK), Marion Leslie
The Little Mascot (1916)
The Right Man (1917)
Jerry's Trial (1917)
The Hidden Children (1917), Guy Johnson
 Heart Strings (1917), Hartley

External links

1870s births
1918 deaths
American male silent film actors
Male actors from Indiana
Male actors from Los Angeles
20th-century American male actors